William MacGillivray FRSE (25 January 1796 – 4 September 1852) was a Scottish naturalist and ornithologist.

Life and work

MacGillivray was born in Old Aberdeen and brought up on Harris. He returned to Aberdeen where he studied Medicine at King's College, graduating MA in 1815. In Old Aberdeen he lived at 107 High Street.

He then became an assistant Dissector in the Anatomy classes. In 1823 he became assistant to Robert Jameson, the Regius Professor of Natural History at the University of Edinburgh. He was curator of the museum of the Royal College of Surgeons of Edinburgh from 1831, resigning in 1841 to become Regius Professor of Natural History at Marischal College, Aberdeen.

MacGillivray was a friend of American bird expert John James Audubon, and wrote a large part of Audubon's Ornithological Biographies from 1830 to 1839. Audubon named MacGillivray's warbler for him.

He died at 67 Crown Street in Aberdeen on 5 September 1852 but is buried in New Calton Cemetery in Edinburgh.
The grave faces east onto the eastern path.

Family

In 1820 he married Marion Askill from Harris. The couple had 10 children, two of whom died in infancy.

Two of MacGillivray's sons achieved recognition as naturalists. His eldest son, John MacGillivray (1822–1867), published an account of the voyage round the world of HMS Rattlesnake, to which he was the onboard naturalist. Another son, Paul, published an Aberdeen Flora in 1853, and donated 214 of his father's paintings to the Natural History Museum.

Legacy

A detailed version of MacGillivray's life, written by a namesake, was published 49 years after the ornithologist's death.

MacGillivray correctly distinguished between the hooded crow and carrion crow, but they were considered only to be subspecies for the next one and a half centuries until, in 2002, on DNA evidence, the hooded crow was awarded species status.

Works

MacGillivray's works include:

Lives of Eminent Zoologists from Aristotle to Linnaeus (1830)
A Systematic Arrangement of British Plants (1830)
The Travels and Researches of Alexander von Humboldt. (1832)
A History of British Quadrupeds (1838)
A Manual of Botany, Comprising Vegetable Anatomy and Physiology (1840)
A History of the Molluscous Animals of Aberdeen, Banff and Kincardine (1843)
A Manual of British Ornithology (1840–1842)
A History of British Birds, indigenous and migratory, in five volumes (1837–1852)
Natural History of Deeside and Braemar (1855), published posthumously
A Hebridean Naturalist's Journal 1817-1818 (1996), published posthumously
A Walk to London (1998), published posthumously

MacGillivray illustrated Henry Witham's 1833 The Internal Structure of Fossil Vegetables found in the Carboniferous and Oolitic deposits of Great Britain, and edited The Conchologist's Text-Book through several editions.

See also

 Thomas Bewick
 William Yarrell

References

External links
 
 Biography at Natural History Museum
  MacGillivray art collection at Natural History Museum
 C. Michael Hogan (2009). Hooded Crow: Corvus cornix, GlobalTwitcher.com, ed, N. Stromberg
 William MacGillivray (1901). A memorial tribute to William MacGillivray, ornithologist, Edinburgh
 
 
 
 
 De Avibus Historiae: MacGillivray by Alberto Masi

1796 births
1852 deaths
People from Aberdeen
Scottish artists
Scottish ornithologists
Scottish biologists
Scottish naturalists
Alumni of the University of Aberdeen
Academics of the University of Aberdeen
Academics of the University of Edinburgh
Fellows of the Royal Society of Edinburgh
Scottish zoologists
Burials at the New Calton Burial Ground
Scottish curators